The Alley of Classics is a sculptural complex located in the Stephen the Great Park in Central Chișinău, Moldova.

Overview 
The alley is decorated on both sides with red granite busts of classic literary figures and political leaders from Moldova. The alley is located between the Ștefan cel Mare boulevard and the bronze bust of Alexander Pushkin, set on a granite column and made by Russian sculptor Alexander Opekushin. The alley was built and received its name in 1958, and became one of the most important tourist attractions in Chișinău. At first there were only twelve sculptures, but after the fall of the Soviet Union the local authorities added busts of Romanian and Moldovan writers and poets that were banned during the Soviet regime.

The idea of a sculptural complex was launched by the interwar sculptor Alexandru Plămădeală, who dreamed to create an open-air museum. Just during the Khrushchev Thaw, the Alley of Classics was unveiled on April 29, 1958, in the Stephen the Great Park (former "A. S. Pușkin" Park). The sculptural complex from Cișmigiu Gardens in Bucharest served as a model.

Busts 
 
The Alley of Classics contains 28 busts (including that of Alexander Pushkin, lying at the head of the alley) in alphabetical order.

Bibliography
 Călina Trifan, "Aleea Clasicilor", Chișinău, Editura "Arc", 2009.

References

Culture in Chișinău
Monuments and memorials in Chișinău
Tourist attractions in Moldova